Edward Howard, 2nd Earl of Carlisle (27 November 1646 – 23 April 1692), known as Viscount Morpeth from 1661 to 1685, was an English Whig politician.

Carlisle was the eldest son of Charles Howard, 1st Earl of Carlisle, and his wife Anne, daughter of Edward Howard, 1st Baron Howard of Escrick. He was elected to the House of Commons for Morpeth in 1666, a seat he held until 1679, and then represented Cumberland from 1679 to 1681 and Carlisle from 1681 to 1685. The latter year he succeeded his father in the earldom and entered the House of Lords. He also served as Deputy Governor of Carlisle between 1679 and 1687 and was an alderman (from 1680) and mayor (1683–84) of the town .

Lord Carlisle married Elizabeth, daughter of Sir William Uvedale of Wickham, Hampshire, in 1668. He died in April 1692, aged 45, and was succeeded in his titles by his son Charles. Lady Carlisle died in 1696.

References

Kidd, Charles, Williamson, David (editors). Debrett's Peerage and Baronetage (1990 edition). New York: St Martin's Press, 1990, 

1646 births
1692 deaths
Edward Howard, 2nd Earl of Carlisle
English army officers
Mayors of Carlisle, Cumbria
English MPs 1661–1679
English MPs 1679
English MPs 1680–1681
English MPs 1681
02